The Four Minute Men were a group of volunteers authorized by United States President Woodrow Wilson to give four-minute speeches on topics given to them by the Committee on Public Information (CPI). In 1917–1918, over 750,000 speeches were given in 5,200 communities by over 75,000 accomplished orators, reaching about 400 million listeners. The topics dealt with the American war effort in the First World War and were presented during the four minutes between reels changing in movie theaters across the country. The speeches were made to be four minutes so that they could be given at town meetings, restaurants, and other places that had an audience.

History

On April 6, 1917, the US Congress declared war on Germany. President Wilson was determined to rouse the public.

Wilson established the first modern propaganda office, the Committee on Public Information (CPI), headed by George Creel.  Creel set out to systematically reach every person in the United States multiple times with patriotic information about how the individual could contribute to the war effort. It also worked with the post office to censor seditious counter-propaganda.   Creel set up divisions in his new agency to produce and distribute innumerable copies of pamphlets, newspaper releases, magazine advertisements, films, school campaigns, and the speeches of the Four Minute Men.  CPI created colorful posters that appeared in every store window, catching the attention of the passersby for a few seconds. Movie theaters were widely attended, and the CPI trained thousands of volunteer speakers to make patriotic appeals during the four-minute breaks needed to change reels.  They also spoke at churches, lodges, fraternal organizations, labor unions, and even logging camps.

CPI Director George Creel boasted that in 18 months his 75,000 volunteers delivered over 7.5 million four-minute orations to over 300 million listeners, in a nation of 103 million people.  The speakers attended training sessions through local universities, and were given pamphlets and speaking tips on a wide variety of topics, such as buying Liberty Bonds, registering for the draft, rationing food, recruiting unskilled workers for munitions jobs, and supporting Red Cross programs.  Ethnic groups were reached in their own languages.

Purpose
With many millions of German Americans, Irish Americans and Scandinavian Americans in the United States, and poor rural Southerners with strong isolationist feelings, there was a strong need for a propaganda campaign to stir support for the war. This effort had many unique challenges to meet to address the existing political climate. Wilson needed to speak directly to the fragmented and spread out audience in the United States.  He had to address the country's self-perception to generate support for the war. The Four Minute Men provided an answer to these challenges.

In addition, the Four Minute Men urged citizens to purchase Liberty Bonds and Thrift Stamps.

Addressing Challenges
The Four Minute Men idea became a useful tool in the propaganda campaign because it addressed a specific rhetorical situation. One of the challenges of the effort was the fragmented audiences of the United States. Many different heritages were represented in the country, and President Wilson needed their support for the war. To address each group's specific needs, the director of the Four Minute Men, William McCormick Blair, delegated the duty of speaking to local men. Well known and respected community figures often volunteered for the Four Minute Men program. This gave the speeches a local voice. The Four Minute Men were given general topics and talking points to follow and rotated between theaters to help the speeches seem fresh, instead of generic propaganda.

The speeches usually depicted Woodrow Wilson as a larger-than-life character and the Germans as less-than-human huns.

Organization
The Four Minute Men were a division of the Committee on Public Information, headed by George Creel. The Committee on Public Information appointed William McCormick Blair as director of the Four Minute Men. Blair appointed state chairmen of the Four Minute Men, who then would appoint a city or community chairman. Each of these appointments needed to be approved in Washington. The local chairman would then appoint a number of speakers to cover the theaters in the city or community for which he is responsible.

Notable Four Minute Men 
 Augustus Post, automotive pioneer, founder of American Automobile Association, champion balloonist and early aviator 
 Lambert Estes Gwinn, Four Minute Man from Covington, Tennessee
 Benjamin Newhall Johnson, Four Minute Man from Lynn, Massachusetts
Albert Dutton MacDade, Pennsylvania State Senator and Judge Pennsylvania Court of Common Pleas (Delaware County)
 Otto J. Zahn, a Southern California Four Minute Man
 Charles Chaplin, a famous comedian
 Douglas Fairbanks
 Alfred Gilbert, an inventor, athlete, magician, toy-maker and businessman
 Mary Pickford
 Louis Webster Gerhardt, attorney, Hazelton, Pennsylvania
 William S. Hart
Ellwood J. Turner, Pennsylvania State Representative from Delaware County (1925-1948), 119th Speaker of the Pennsylvania House of Representatives (1939-1941)
 DeForest H. Perkins, School Superintendent and future Grand Dragon of the Maine Ku Klux Klan

References 

Bibliography
Cornebise, Alfred E. War as Advertised: the Four Minute Men and America's crusade, 1917-1918. Philadelphia: American Philosophical Society, 1984.  
Cornwell, Elmer E. Jr. "Wilson, Creel, and the Presidency." The Public Opinion Quarterly, Vol 23, No. 2, pages 189–202.  ISSN 0033-362X
Creel, George. "Propaganda and Morale". The American Journal of Sociology, Vol. 47, No. 3. (Nov., 1941), pages 340–351. ISSN 0002-9602
Creel, George. How We Advertised America: The First Telling of the Amazing Story of the Committee on Public Information That Carried the Gospel of Americanism to Every Corner of the Globe Corner (1920) 
Larson, Cedric, and James R. Mock. "The Lost Files of the Creel Committee". The Public Opinion Quarterly, Vol. 3, No. 1. (Jan., 1939), pages 5–29. ISSN 0033-362X
Larson, Cedric, and James R. Mock. "The Four-Minute Men." The Quarterly Journal of Speech: 97-112. ISSN 0033-5630
 Mastrangelo,  Lisa. "World War I, public intellectuals, and the Four Minute Men: Convergent ideals of public speaking and civic participation." Rhetoric & Public Affairs 12#4 (2009): 607-633.
Oukrop, Carol. "The Four Minute Men Became National Network During World War I." Journalism Quarterly: 632-637. ISSN 0196-3031
 Vaughn, Stephen L. Holding Fast the Inner Lines: Democracy, Nationalism, and the Committee on Public Information (2nd ed. 2011), a standard scholarly history

Primary sources
 Committee on public information, Complete Report of the Committee on Public Information: 1917, 1918, 1919 (1920) online free

World War I propaganda
United States home front during World War I
Public relations techniques
Political communication
World War I speeches

Further reading
 John Maxwell Hamilton, Manipulating the Masses: Woodrow Wilson and the Birth of American Propaganda